By Appointment Only may refer to: 

 By Appointment Only (1933 film)
 By Appointment Only (2007 film)